Sergei Anatolyevich Stepanenko (born 25 January 1981) is a former Kazakh-Russian professional footballer.

Club career
He played in the Russian Football National League for FC Terek Grozny in 2007.

References

External links
 

1981 births
People from Izobilnensky District
Living people
Russian footballers
Association football goalkeepers
FC Dynamo Stavropol players
FC Akhmat Grozny players
FC Taraz players
FC Kairat players
FC Zhetysu players
Kazakhstan Premier League players
Russian expatriate footballers
Expatriate footballers in Kazakhstan
Russian expatriate sportspeople in Kazakhstan
Sportspeople from Stavropol Krai